Vučkić is a surname. Notable people with the surname include:

Alen Vučkić (born 1990), Slovenian footballer
Haris Vučkić (born 1992), Slovenian footballer, brother of Alen

See also
Vukić

Bosnian surnames
Slovene-language surnames